Charlotte Peak is an  mountain summit located in Powell County of the U.S. state of Montana.

Description

Charlotte Peak is located in the Swan Range, a subset of the Rocky Mountains. It is situated in the Bob Marshall Wilderness, on land managed by Flathead National Forest. Precipitation runoff from the mountain drains to Big Salmon Lake and the South Fork Flathead River.

Climate

Based on the Köppen climate classification, Charlotte Peak is located in a subarctic climate zone characterized by long, usually very cold winters, and short, cool to mild summers. Winter temperatures can drop below −10 °F with wind chill factors below −30 °F.

See also
 Geology of the Rocky Mountains

References

External links
 Weather: Charlotte Peak

Mountains of Montana
North American 2000 m summits
Flathead National Forest